The seventh season of RuPaul's Drag Race All Stars (also referred to as RuPaul's Drag Race All Stars: All Winners on the show) premiered on Paramount+ on May 20 and concluded on July 29, 2022.

The cast was announced on April 13, 2022, and included eight past winners returning to the competition. The winning queen received a cash prize of $200,000. The season consisted of twelve episodes, with the first two airing on the same day, and featured an Untucked aftershow.

The season featured a new format twist: throughout the season, no one was eliminated. Instead, each week, two top All Stars were awarded a "Legendary Legend Star". The top 2 competed in a Lip Sync For Your Legacy; the winner earned a cash tip and the power to block one of her fellow queens from receiving a star the next week. In the finale, the four queens with the most stars participated in a Lip Sync Smackdown to determine the winner, who received a cash prize of $200,000 and the title "Queen of All Queens". The other four queens participated in a parallel Lip Sync Smackdown for a cash prize of $50,000 and the title of "Queen of She Done Already Done Had Herses".

Jinkx Monsoon won the season and the title of "Queen of All Queens". Monét X Change was the runner-up. Raja won the "Queen of She Done Already Done Had Herses" title.

Contestants 

(Ages, names, and cities stated are at time of filming.)

Notes:

Contestant progress

Lip syncs 
Legend:

Notes:

Guest judges
Listed in chronological order:

Cameron Diaz, actress and model
Daphne Guinness, socialite and designer
Kirby Howell-Baptiste, actress
Jeffrey Bowyer-Chapman, actor and model
Nikki Glaser, stand-up comedian and actress
Tove Lo, Swedish singer, songwriter and actress
Betsey Johnson, fashion designer
Janicza Bravo, film director and producer
Ben Platt, actor, singer and songwriter
Ronan Farrow, journalist
Hannah Einbinder, comedian and actress

Special guests
Guests who appeared in episodes, but did not judge on the main stage.

Episode 1: 
Raven, runner-up of both Drag Race Season 2 and All Stars 1
Naomi Campbell, British supermodel and actress

Episode 3: 
Vanna White, American television personality

Episode 5: 
Nancy Pelosi, Speaker of the United States House of Representatives

Episode 6: 
Leland, producer

Episode 10:
Kennedy Davenport, contestant on Drag Race Season 7 and runner-up of All Stars 3
Solomon Georgio, writer and comedian
Wintergreen, drag persona of Sarge, Drag Race cameraman and Peppermint's makeover subject on Drag Race Season 9

Episodes

References

2022 American television seasons
2022 in LGBT history
RuPaul's Drag Race All Stars seasons